Kazi Abdul Wadud (26 April 1894 - 19 May 1970) was a Bengali essayist, prominent critic, dramatist and biographer. He was born into a lower-middle-class family, in larger Faridpur (present) Rajbari, Pangsha. His father's name was Kazi Sayed hosen (also Kazi Sagiruddin).

Academic life

In 1913, he passed matriculation from Dhaka Collegiate School. Then he passed l.A. and B.A. from Presidency College, Kolkata. In 1919 he completed an M.A. in economics from Calcutta University.

Contributions

In 1926, he founded Muslim Sahitto Somaj in Dhaka and he also led the Buddhir Mukti (rising up from ignorance) movement with some young writers. His newspaper Shikha helped to increase the growth of the movement. Sayed Abdul hossen and Qazi Motahar Hossain also joined this movement. Kazi Abdul Wadud was closely related with the Bengali Muslim literary movement.

Career

He took a job with Kolkata textbook board. In 1920 he joined Dhaka intermediate college (now  Dhaka College) as a professor of literature because it was very rare to find a graduate post in Bengali. After 1947, Dhaka University proposed him for teaching but he got more opportunities for writing in Kolkata and stayed there for the remainder of his life.

Marriage
In 1916, he married his uncle's eldest daughter, Jamila khatun. She died in 1954.

Essays
 Saswoto Bongo
 Somaj O Sahitto

Others books
Mir poribar (story), 1918
Nodibokshe(Novel), unknown date
Robindro kabbo pattho(Criticism), Bengali 1334 AD
Torun (A collection of story and short dramas) Kolkata, Bengali 1355 A.D.
Poth o bipoth(Drama)  Bengali 1346
Nazrul prothiva(Criticism), 1949
Azad(Novel), 1948
Creative Bengal (a translation of Bengali essays), 1950
Pobitro Quraner Prothom part (torjoma) Bengali 1337 Adt

Awards
In 1970, he got "Shisir kumar award"

Quotation
"I don't want poverty for man, I want that which is great prosperity."

References

Bengali-language literature
Bangladeshi male writers
Bengali writers
Bengali-language writers
Male essayists
1894 births
1970 deaths
Bengali Muslims
20th-century Bengalis
Indian writers
20th-century Indian writers
20th-century Indian essayists
Indian male essayists
Indian dramatists and playwrights
20th-century Indian dramatists and playwrights
Indian male dramatists and playwrights
Indian biographers
Academic staff of Dhaka College
20th-century essayists
Writers from West Bengal
20th-century Indian male writers
Indian literary critics
20th-century Indian novelists
20th-century Indian short story writers